Pietro Paolo Capobianco (died 1505) was a Roman Catholic prelate who served as Bishop of Sant'Agata de' Goti (1487–1505).

Biography
On 16 February 1487, Pietro Paolo Capobianco was appointed during the papacy of Pope Innocent VIII as Bishop of Sant'Agata de' Goti.
He served as Bishop of Sant'Agata de' Goti until his death in 1505.
While bishop, he was the principal co-consecrator of Henri d'Aradon, Auxiliary Bishop of Vannes and Titular Bishop of Citrus (1490).

References

External links and additional sources
 (for Chronology of Bishops) 
 (for Chronology of Bishops) 

15th-century Italian Roman Catholic bishops
16th-century Italian Roman Catholic bishops
Bishops appointed by Pope Innocent VIII
1505 deaths